Patrícia Matieli Machado (born 8 November 1988) is a Brazilian handballer for MKS Zagłębie Lubin and the Brazilian national team.

She participated at the Olimpic Games Tokyo 2020.

Achievements

National team
Pan American Games:
Winner: 2019
South American Games :
Winner: 2018 
2018 South and Central American Women's Handball Championship:
Winner: 2018 
Winner: 2021
World Women's Handball Championship:
18th: 2017
17th: 2019
06th: 2021

Domestic competitions
Polish Superleague:
Winner: 2016/2017- 2020/2021 - 2021/2022
2nd Place: 2018/2019 - 2019/2020
3rd Place: 2015/2016
Puchar Polski:
Winner: 2015/2016 - 2018/2019 - 2019/2020 - 2020/2021
2nd Place: 2021/2022
Brazil National League:
Winner: 2014 - 2015

Individual awards
Polish Superleague
Best Centre Back of the Season:  2019/2020 - 2020/2021 - 2021/2022
Best Player of the Match:  7x (Season 2020/2021)
Best Player of the Match:  8x (Season 2021/2022)

References

1.Brazil squad 2017 World Women's Handball Championship

2.Brazil squad 2019 World Women's Handball Championship

External links

1998 births
Living people
Brazilian female handball players
Handball players from São Paulo
Expatriate handball players in Poland
Brazilian expatriate sportspeople in Poland
South American Games gold medalists for Brazil
South American Games medalists in handball
Competitors at the 2018 South American Games
Handball players at the 2019 Pan American Games
Pan American Games medalists in handball
Pan American Games gold medalists for Brazil
Medalists at the 2019 Pan American Games
Handball players at the 2020 Summer Olympics